Krone (3,187 m) is a mountain of the Silvretta Alps, located on the border between Austria and Switzerland. It lies south of the Fluchthorn, on the range between the Jamtal (Tyrol) and the Val Fenga (Graubünden).

References

External links
 Krone on Hikr

Mountains of the Alps
Mountains of Graubünden
Mountains of Tyrol (state)
Austria–Switzerland border
International mountains of Europe
Mountains of Switzerland
Valsot